Dr. U. Conrad Vincent was an American physician.

Vincent graduated from the University of Pennsylvania Medical School in 1917. He applied for and was initially rejected for an internship at Bellevue Hospital; however, Mayor John Hylan requested that his application be reconsidered, and he then became the first African American intern at the hospital. He became a urological surgeon and founded the Vincent Sanitarium and Hospital in Harlem in 1929.

References

American urologists
Year of birth missing
Year of death missing